The seventeenth season of The Bachelorette premiered on June 7, 2021. The season featured 30-year-old Katie Thurston, a bank marketing manager from Lynnwood, Washington. 

Thurston previously finished in eleventh place on the 25th season of The Bachelor featuring Matt James. As with the previous season, the entire season was filmed at Hyatt Regency Tamaya Resort & Spa in Santa Ana Pueblo, New Mexico due to the COVID-19 pandemic.

The season concluded on August 9, 2021, with Thurston accepting a proposal from 30-year-old wildlife manager Blake Moynes. They ended their engagement on October 25, 2021. Thurston announced on November 23, 2021, that she was dating John Hersey, whom she had previously eliminated during week two of this season. They announced their break up on June 20, 2022.

Production

Casting and contestants
Thurston was announced as the Bachelorette by Emmanuel Acho during the After the Final Rose special of the 25th season of The Bachelor on March 15, 2021, alongside season 18 lead Michelle Young.

Notable contestants include Andrew Spencer, who is the cousin of season 14 contestant Clay Harbor.

Filming and development
The beginning of the series returned to its traditional summer schedule after the previous season was delayed to October 2020 due to the COVID-19 pandemic. As with the last two American Bachelor Nation editions, this season was originally set to be filmed in a bio-secure bubble at the Fairmont Jasper Park Lodge in Jasper, Alberta, Canada. Due to quarantine measures enforced by the Canadian government would require to travel to Canada, production was later pulled from the location in early February 2021 amid travel restrictions. This season was then filmed in Hyatt Regency Tamaya Resort & Spa in Santa Ana Pueblo, New Mexico.

On March 13, 2021, it was announced that former Bachelorette leads Tayshia Adams and Kaitlyn Bristowe would host this season, replacing long-time series host Chris Harrison following backlash for his support of Rachael Kirkconnell, a contestant on the previous The Bachelor season 25, whose photos resurfaced of her attending an Antebellum South-themed party.

Contestants
34 potential contestants were revealed on March 18, 2021. The final cast of 30 men was released on May 18, 2021. Greg Grippo and Karl Smith were originally cast in season 16, when filming of that season was due to start in March 2020 as television productions were shut down caused by the pandemic, the former was not called back for the rescheduled production in July 2020, and the latter was initially accepted to be brought back on that season but was not selected in the final casting list of that same month.

In week 3, season 16 contestant Blake Moynes joined the cast.

Future appearances

Bachelor in Paradise
Season 7

Aaron Clancy, Connor Brennan, James Bonsall, Karl Smith, Tré Cooper, and Thomas Jacobs returned for season 7 of Bachelor in Paradise. Cooper quit in Week 2. Smith and Brennan were eliminated in Week 2. Jacobs spilt from Becca Kufrin in week 6, although they later got back together. Bonsall and Clancy split from Anna Redman and Tia Booth, respectively, in week 6.

Season 8

Bonsall, Clancy, Andrew Spencer, Justin Glaze, and Michael Allio returned for season 8 of Bachelor in Paradise. Bonsall and Glaze were eliminated in week 2. Glaze returned in week 4 and was eliminated again in the same week. Spencer quit in week 5. Clancy split from Genevieve Parisi in week 6. Allio left in a relationship with Danielle Maltby in week 6.

Bachelor in Paradise Canada
Brendan Scanzano returned for the inaugural season of Bachelor in Paradise Canada. He spilt from Bachelor season 25 contestant Illeana Pennetto in week 5.

Call-out order

 The contestant received the first impression rose
 The contestant received a rose during a date
 The contestant received a rose outside of a rose ceremony or date
 The contestant was eliminated
 The contestant was eliminated during a date
 The contestant was eliminated outside the rose ceremony
 The contestant quit the competition
 The contestant moved on to the next week by default
 The contestant won the competition

Episodes

Notes

References

External links

2021 American television seasons
The Bachelorette (American TV series) seasons
Television series impacted by the COVID-19 pandemic
Television shows filmed in New Mexico